James Edward Tait  (27 May 1888 – 11 August 1918), was a Scottish/Canadian recipient of the Victoria Cross, the highest and most prestigious award for gallantry in the face of the enemy that can be awarded to British and Commonwealth forces.

Background
Tait was born on 27 May 1888 in Maxwelltown (Dumfries), Scotland to James Bryden Tait and Mary Johnstone. He married Jessie Spiers Aitken from California. He joined the Canadian Expeditionary Force in February 1916.

World War I
Tait was 30 years old, and a lieutenant in the 78th (Winnipeg Grenadiers) Battalion, Canadian Expeditionary Force, during the First World War.

He died in action on 11 August 1918 in Amiens, France. He was awarded the VC for his actions that day.

VC citation

Lieutenant James Edward Tait was also awarded the Military Cross at the Battle of Vimy Ridge. The citation for this award is as follows:
"For conspicuous gallantry and devotion to duty. Early in an assault he was wounded, and all the other officers killed or wounded, but he led his company with great fearlessness and determination through intense fire to the objective, and, although unable to walk, supervised its consolidation, finally crawling back alone, to leave for others the four bearers."

Due to his previous work with the Hudson Bay Railway survey, a siding south of Lynn Lake, Manitoba was named Jetait in his honour. Lieutenant Tait also has an island named after him in the Winnipeg River, Manitoba between the Pinawa Marina and the Pinawa Sailing Club.

Tait is buried at Fouquescourt British Cemetery which is located 16 miles south of Albert, France (special memorial, grave 8). His Victoria Cross is displayed at the Glenbow Museum in Calgary, Alberta, Canada.

References

Further reading 
Monuments to Courage (David Harvey, 1999)
The Register of the Victoria Cross (This England, 1997)
Scotland's Forgotten Valour (Graham Ross, 1995)

External links
 James Eward Tait's digitized service file
 James Edward Tait (service/personal details, photograph, citation, relevant documents, burial information)
 Legion Magazine

1886 births
1918 deaths
Canadian World War I recipients of the Victoria Cross
Canadian military personnel killed in World War I
Scottish emigrants to Canada
Canadian Expeditionary Force officers
Scottish military personnel
People from Dumfries
Canadian recipients of the Military Cross
British Yeomanry soldiers
Winnipeg Grenadiers
Winnipeg Grenadiers officers